Naravi is a panchayat village in Belthangady taluk, Dakshina Kannada, in the foothills of the Western Ghats of India. There are two villages in the Naravi gram panchayat: Naravi and Kuthluru. It is 58 km from Mangalore and 25 km from Karkala towards Dharmasthala. Naravi is known for Sri Sooryanarayana temple, one of the two well known Sun temples, the other of which is at Konark. The village's name came from "Naa Ravi" in Kannada, which means no visible sunlight because of forest at daytime. It also has Sri Veenugopalakrishna Temple, which has a beautiful idol of Krishna carrying a child in his hands. Those who don't have children come to this statue of Krishna to pray for children.

Naravi village is also known for St. Antony Shrine, a Catholic church for its miraculous history, and the works of Fr. Faustine Corti who tried to uplift the poor in the year around 1900. Starting from Western Ghats, River Suvarna flows in the banks of Sri Suryanarayana Temple and joins Arabian Sea near Mangalore. Lot of devotees around the world visit these divine shrines to worship. And holy lord Sooryanarayana (Sun God) on the auspicious day of Simha Sankramana. Naravi is also well known for Sri Venu Gopal Krishna Temple.

Demographics
 India census, the village of Naravi had a population of 3,900, with 1,925 males (49.4%) and 1,975 female (50.6%), for a gender ratio of 1026 females per thousand males.

In the 2011 India census, Naravi was recorded as having 3,985 inhabitants.

Bus stop
The high-tech bus stand was inaugurated on January 21, 2018 and is located about 45 kilometres from the famous Dharmastala Manjunatheshwara temple. As a fusion of Indian architecture and European Inspiration, the roof of the bus shelter is in the shape of a banyan tree leaf. It is learnt to be first of its kind bus stop inspired from modern facilities in Germany and other countries in Europe blended with Indian architecture and more importantly built by a common man.

There are comfortable stainless steel seating arrangements for about 30 people, route map, bus time table, notice boards for community information, emergency contact numbers, mobile chargers, interlock flooring, radio, a small garden, solar power system, warm and cold drinking water facility, CCTV camera for surveillance and dustbins. It is in sync with Prime Ministers Swach Bharat Abhiyan - Clean India initiative. The bus stand also has a mirror, clock and runs on solar energy.

Educational Organizations
 St. Paul's English Med. School (Near St. Antony Church, Naravi)
 St. paul's higher Primary School (Near St. Antony Church, Naravi)
     Naravi High School - Aided (Near St. Antony Church, Naravi)
     Govt. High School (Near by Bus stand, Naravi)
     St. Antony PU College (Near St. Antony Church, Naravi)
     St. Antony Degree College (Near St. Antony Church, Naravi)

Reference Notes

External links 
  Naravi population and PHC

Villages in Dakshina Kannada district